William Hendy (2 April 1900 – 23 September 1992) was a New Zealand cricketer. He played two first-class matches for Auckland in 1927/28.

See also
 List of Auckland representative cricketers

References

External links
 

1900 births
1992 deaths
New Zealand cricketers
Auckland cricketers
Cricketers from Auckland